Elio Schneeman (October 16, 1961 – August 17, 1997) was an American poet. Born in Taranto, Italy of American heritage, Schneeman moved with his family to New York City in 1966. He was well-known and respected by poets associated with the Poetry Project in New York. Schneeman's poems were published in numerous literary magazines, as well as the anthologies Nice To See You: Homage to Ted Berrigan (Coffee House Press), Out of This World (Crown/Random House), and (posthumously) An Anthology of New (American) Poets (Talisman House).


Works

Notes

References

External links
four poems at RealPoetik
For Ted at $lavery: Cyberzine of the Arts

1961 births
1997 deaths
People from Taranto
20th-century American poets